Live at Montreux is an album by pianist Les McCann recorded at the Montreux Jazz Festival in 1972 and released on the Atlantic label.

Reception

Allmusic gave the album a 4 stars, stating "Atlantic got enough from McCann's set to put out a hot double album loaded with gritty vocals, gospel-drenched electric piano, cooking instrumentals, plenty of his popular protest songs, and a few new numbers such as the driving "Cochise"".

Track listing 
All compositions by Les McCann except as indicated
 "Cochise" – 6:10
 "Comment" (Yusuf Rahman, Charles Wright) – 1:27
 "Price You Gotta Pay to Be Free" (Nat Adderley) – 5:00
 "What's Going On" (Renaldo Benson, Al Cleveland, Marvin Gaye) – 8:30
 "North Carolina" – 11:30
 "Carry on Brother" (Eddie Harris) – 9:30
 "With These Hands" (Benny Davis, Abner Silver) – 9:35
 "Compared to What" (Gene McDaniels) – 6:30
 "Get Yourself Together" (Les McCann, Rev. Bee) – 15:23
 "Home Again" (Les McCann, Rahsaan Roland Kirk) – 5:02

Personnel 
Les McCann – piano, vocals, clavinet, percussion, miscellaneous instruments
Jimmy Rowser – bass
Donald Dean – drums
Buck Clarke – African drums, percussion
Rahsaan Roland Kirk – tenor saxophone (tracks 9 & 10)

References 

Les McCann live albums
1973 live albums
Atlantic Records live albums
Albums recorded at the Montreux Jazz Festival
Albums produced by Joel Dorn